Dierogekko inexpectatus also known as Key New Caledonian Gecko is a gecko endemic to Grande Terre in New Caledonia.

References

Dierogekko
Reptiles described in 2006
Taxa named by Aaron M. Bauer
Taxa named by Todd R. Jackman
Taxa named by Ross Allen Sadlier
Taxa named by Anthony Whitaker
Geckos of New Caledonia